Method Studios is a visual effects company launched in 1999 in Los Angeles, California with facilities in New York, Atlanta, Vancouver, San Francisco, Melbourne, Montreal, and Pune. The company provides production and post-production services including conceptual design, look development, on-set supervision, 3D animation/CGI, matte painting, AR/VR, compositing and finishing.

Some commercial and feature projects produced by Method Studios have been recognized by award bodies such as the Visual Effects Society (VES) and Association of Independent Commercial Producers (AICP). Some Method staff have been invited to speak at industry conferences such as SIGGRAPH, NAB, Collider and the VES Production Summit.

Affiliations 
In late 2010, Method Studios was acquired by Deluxe to form part of the Deluxe Entertainment Services Group Inc. This group includes other companies specializing in post-production such as Company 3 (color grading), Encore (TV post-production and visual effects), and Beast (editorial). Method Studios co-locate with both Company 3 and Beast in Atlanta, share facility space with Company 3 in Los Angeles and New York, and share facility space with Encore in Vancouver. In 2018 Deluxe Entertainment Services Group Inc. acquired the award-winning VFX studio Atomic Fiction, and joined it with Method Studios. In November 2020 it was announced that Method Studios, along with Company 3 and several of Deluxe's other creative businesses, would be acquired by Framestore.

Clients 
Method Studios has collaborated on feature films with many top studios such as Warner Bros., Twentieth Century Fox, Walt Disney Studios, Marvel Studios and Paramount. In terms of commercial production, the company maintains working relationships with many award-winning directors such as Noam Murro, Tom Kuntz, Jake Scott, Nicolai Fuglsig and Mark Romanek. Commercial clients include Verizon, DirecTV, Kia Motors, Microsoft, Bridgestone, Chrysler and Canon through agencies David&Goliath, Grey, Goodby, Silverstein & Partners, Twofifteen and TBWA/Chiat Day and many more.

Filmography

2000s

2010s

2020s

Commercials 
Commercial visual effects work produced by Method Studios includes Justin Timberlake's Filthy, Microsoft Surface: Combo, The Battle of Evony, Ford: Be the Guardian of Your Galaxy, and Nature Valley: Swimmer. They also did commercials for Fox NFL Sunday featuring Cleatus.

Method Design 
Method Design is a design arm of Method Studios located within their Los Angeles and New York offices.
This group has completed main titles and design for feature films and episodic shows including Godless, American Horror Story, The Night Of, and El Chapo. In addition to the film and trailer markets, Method Design has also done extensive commercial design work with Method Studios' commercial visual effects and finishing teams around the world.

Awards won 
Visual Effects Society Awards
2013, Outstanding Compositing in a Commercial - Chevy '2012 Silverado'
2011, Outstanding Visual Effects in a Live Action Commercial - Halo Reach 'Deliver Hope'

AICP Awards
2014, VFX - GE 'Childlike Imagination'
2013, Animation - DirecTV 'Troll'
2011, VFX - Halo Reach 'Deliver Hope'

Clio Awards
2014, Silver winner for VFX - DirecTV 'Troll'
2012, Gold winner for VFX - Jameson 'Fire'
2007, Gold winner for VFX – Adidas ‘Carry’
2005, Silver winner for VFX – Sears ‘Arboretum’

London International Awards
2013, Bronze for Music Video VFX - Deadmau5 'Professional Greifers'
2013, Bronze for Commercial Animation - DirecTV 'Troll'
2012, Silver for VFX - Kia 'Share Some Soul'
2011, Gold for VFX - Halo Reach 'Deliver Hope'

Australian Effects and Animation Festival (AEAF Awards)
2013, Commercial Animation - DirecTV 'Troll' 
2013, Idents & Stings - SBS 'Fresh History' 
2013, Music Videos - Deadmau5 'Professional Greifers'
2012, Commercial Animation - Kia 'Share Some Soul'

Hollywood Post Alliance Awards
2014, VFX - GE 'Childlike Imagination
2012, Compositing - Chevy '2012 Silverado'
2011, Compositing - Jameson 'Fire'

CICLOPE Awards
2014, Gold for Live Action VFX - GE 'Childlike Imagination
2013, Bronze for Live Action VFX - DirecTV 'Troll'
2012, Silver for Live Action VFX - Halo 4 'The Commissioning'

3D World
2011, Best use of CG in Advertising - Halo Reach 'Deliver Hope'

References

External links
 Method Studios on Internet Movie Database
 
 Method Design

Mass media companies established in 1998
Visual effects companies